Czesław Mroczek (born 20 July 1964 in Kałuszyn) is a Polish politician. He was elected to the Sejm on 25 September 2005, getting 8,311 votes in 18 Siedlce district as a candidate from the Civic Platform list. He was re-elected with 33,207 votes.

See also
Members of Polish Sejm 2005-2007

External links
Czesław Mroczek - parliamentary page - includes declarations of interest, voting record, and transcripts of speeches.
personal site (pl)

Civic Platform politicians
1964 births
Living people
Members of the Polish Sejm 2005–2007
Members of the Polish Sejm 2007–2011
Members of the Polish Sejm 2011–2015
Members of the Polish Sejm 2015–2019
Members of the Polish Sejm 2019–2023
University of Warsaw alumni